Muldraugh Hill is an escarpment in Bullitt, Hardin, Jefferson, and Nelson counties of central Kentucky separating the Bluegrass on the north and north-east from the Pennyrile on the south and south-west.  This escarpment fades into the Pottsville Escarpment on the east, and terminates at the Ohio River in the west, although in truth it continues in Indiana as Floyds Knobs.

In parts of its eastern stretches, Muldraugh Hill is little more than a slight hill, but in some of the western areas, it is represented by extensive areas of knobs.  This landform consists mostly of siltstones and shales, with some minor limestones, lying between the limestones and dolomites of the older Bluegrass and the limestones of the newer Pennyrile.  Rock outcrops are minor except where the overlying limestones are exposed in the north end of Fort Knox.

The Jefferson Memorial Forest in Louisville, Kentucky and Bernheim Forest in Bullitt and Nelson Counties are both located within the knobs of Muldraugh Hill, as is part of Fort Knox.

References

See also
Geography of Louisville, Kentucky

Escarpments of the United States
Landforms of Louisville, Kentucky
Landforms of Kentucky
Landforms of Bullitt County, Kentucky
Landforms of Nelson County, Kentucky